Ainaro, officially Ainaro Administrative Post, is an administrative post (and was formerly a subdistrict) in Ainaro municipality, East Timor. Its seat or administrative centre is the suco of Ainaro.

The administrative post has a population of approximately 14,130 people (2001). It contains the small mountain town of Ainaro, which is also the capital of the municipality, along with the sucos of Ainaro, Soro, Maununo, Cassa, Suro Craic, Manutassi, and Mau-Ulo.

References

External links 

  – information page on Ministry of State Administration site 

Administrative posts of East Timor
Ainaro Municipality